John Llewellyn Davies  (25 May 1938 – 21 July 2003) was a New Zealand Olympic bronze medallist and president of the New Zealand Olympic Committee (NZOC).

Biography
Davies was born in London, England, to Welsh parents, and in 1953 moved to New Zealand with his family. The family settled in Tokoroa. He won a bronze medal in the 1500 metres at the 1964 Tokyo Olympic Games, and a silver medal in the one mile event at the 1962 Commonwealth Games in Perth.

Davies retired due to long-term injuries, and after that coached middle- and long-distance athletes, including 1976 Olympic 5000 m silver medallist Dick Quax, 1982 Commonwealth Games 3000m Gold Medalist Anne Audain who also broke the World 5000m record the same year. 1992 Olympic Marathon bronze medallist Lorraine Moller and 1996 Olympic 800 m finalist Toni Hodgkinson. He also contributed to sport as administrator and television commentator.

In the 1990 Queen's Birthday Honours, Davies was appointed a Member of the Order of the British Empire, for services to athletics. In October 2000, Davies succeeded Sir David Beattie to become the NZOC president. In 2003 he was awarded the Leonard Cuff medal by the International Olympic Academy for promoting olympism, only weeks before he died of melanoma.

References

External links
Page with Photo at Sporting Heroes
New Zealand Olympic Committee announcement of his death
New Zealand Herald report on his death
 https://www.nzherald.co.nz/nz/iobituaryi-john-davies/Z2HKIB7MS6KU6ILXJUUADMK6OU/
 https://www.olympic.org.nz/athletes/john-davies/
 https://athletics.org.nz/legends/john-davies-mbe/
 https://nzhistory.govt.nz/peter-snell-completes-the-800-1500-m-double-in-tokyo

1938 births
2003 deaths
New Zealand male middle-distance runners
Athletes (track and field) at the 1964 Summer Olympics
Olympic athletes of New Zealand
Olympic bronze medalists for New Zealand
Commonwealth Games silver medallists for New Zealand
Athletes (track and field) at the 1962 British Empire and Commonwealth Games
New Zealand referees and umpires
New Zealand athletics coaches
Athletes from London
Commonwealth Games medallists in athletics
New Zealand Members of the Order of the British Empire
Welsh emigrants to New Zealand
Medalists at the 1964 Summer Olympics
Olympic bronze medalists in athletics (track and field)
Medallists at the 1962 British Empire and Commonwealth Games